Mehrzamin (also Romanized as Mehrzamīn) is a village in Qahan Rural District, Khalajastan District, Qom County, Qom Province, Iran.

Description 
At the 2006 census, its population was 479, in 127 families.

References 

Populated places in Qom Province